Amos Emerson Dolbear (November 10, 1837 – February 23, 1910) was an American physicist and inventor.  Dolbear researched electrical spark conversion into sound waves and electrical impulses. He was a professor at University of Kentucky in Lexington from 1868 until 1874.  In 1874 he became the chair of the physics department at Tufts University in Medford, Massachusetts. He is known for his 1882 invention of a system for transmitting telegraph signals without wires.  In 1899 his patent for it was purchased in an unsuccessful attempt to interfere with Guglielmo Marconi's wireless telegraphy patents in the United States.

Biography
Amos Dolbear was born in Norwich, Connecticut, on November 10, 1837. He was a graduate of Ohio Wesleyan University, in Delaware, Ohio. While a student there, he had made a "talking telegraph" and invented a receiver containing two features of the modern telephone: a permanent magnet and a metallic diaphragm that he made from a tintype. He invented the first telephone receiver with a permanent magnet in 1865, 11 years before Alexander Graham Bell patented his model. Later, Dolbear couldn't prove his claim, so Bell kept the patent. Dolbear lost his case before the U. S. Supreme Court, (Dolbear et al. v. American Bell Telephone Company). The June 18, 1881, edition of Scientific American reported: 

In 1876, Dolbear patented a magneto electric telephone. He patented a static telephone in 1879.

In 1882, Dolbear was able to communicate over a distance of a quarter of a mile without wires in the Earth. His device relied on conduction in the ground, which was different from later radio transmissions that used electromagnetic radiation. He received a U.S. patent for a wireless telegraph in March of that year. His set-up used phones grounded by metal rods poked into the earth. His transmission range was at least as much as a half a mile and he received a patent for this device, in 1886. (He did not patent his system in Europe.)

In 1899, The New England Wireless Telegraph and Telephone Company, a subsidiary of the American Wireless Telephone and Telegraph Company, purchased Dolbear's 1886 patent, and filed a suit against Marconi for infringement. However, in March 1901, a United States Circuit Court dismissed the suit. In April 1902, American Wireless petitioned Congress to extend the 1886 patent by ten years, but was unsuccessful, so it duly expired on October 4, 1903. In 1905, the New York Circuit Court further noted that the Dolbear patent was "inoperative, and that, even if operative, it operates by virtue of radically different electrical laws and phenomena" than the radio signaling used by Marconi.

In 1868 Dolbear (while a professor at Bethany College) invented the electrostatic telephone.  He also invented the opeidoscope (an instrument for visualizing vibration of sound waves, using a mirror mounted on a membrane) and a system of incandescent lighting. He authored several books, articles, and pamphlets, and was recognized for his contributions to science at both the Paris Exposition in 1881 and the Crystal Palace Exposition in 1882.

In 1897, Dolbear published an article "The Cricket as a Thermometer" that noted the correlation between the ambient temperature and the rate at which crickets chirp. The formula expressed in that article became known as Dolbear's Law.

He died at his home in Medford on February 23, 1910.

Publications

Books
 The Art of Projecting, Boston, 1876
 The Speaking Telephone, 1877
 Sound and its Phenomena, 1885
 Matter, Ether, and Motion, Boston, 1892
 First Principles of Natural Philosophy, Boston,  1897
 Modes of Motion, Boston,  1897

Journal articles
 "The Cricket as a Thermometer". The American Naturalist, Vol. 31, No. 371 (November 1897), pp. 970–971. Published by The University of Chicago Press for The American Society of Naturalists

Patents
 Apparatus for transmitting sound by electricity  April 5, 1881.

References

External links

 
 
 Concise Encyclopedia of Tufts History - Dolbear, Amos Emerson, 1837–1910
 Just Who Did Invent Radio?
 Roxbury's Professor Dolbear
 A portrait of Prof. Dolbear

1837 births
1910 deaths
19th-century American inventors
20th-century American inventors
American physicists
Ohio Wesleyan University alumni
University of Kentucky faculty
Tufts University faculty